Yossi is a Hebrew given name, usually a short and nickname for Yosef (equivalent to English Joseph). It may refer to:

People 
 Abba Yossi – mythology figure
 Country Yossi – American singer and radio personality
Yossi Abu – Israeli executive officer
Yossi Abukasis – Israeli football player
 Yossi Aharon – musician and Greek bouzouki player
 Yossi Alpher – Israeli political activist
 Yossi Banai – Israeli actor, singer and playwright
 Yossi Beilin – Israeli politician (former minister in the Israeli government)
 Jose ben Halafta (aka Rabbi Yossi) – Jewish tanna
 Yossi Ben Hanan – Israeli general
 Yossi Benayoun (born 1980) – Israeli football player
 Yossi Cedar – Israeli filmmaker
 Yossi Dagan – Israeli activist
 Yossi Dahan – Israeli scholar and activist
 Yossi Ghinsberg – Israeli adventurer, author, entrepreneur, humanitarian, and motivational speaker
 Yossi Green – Jewish American composer
 Yossi Harel – Israeli military person
 Yossi Katz – Israeli politician
Yossi Katz (geographer), Israeli professor in political geography
 Yossi Klafter - Israeli chemical physics professor, the eighth President of Tel Aviv University
 Yossi Klein Halevi – Israeli journalist and writer
 Yossi Maiman – Israeli businessman
 Yossi Melman – Israeli journalist and writer
 Yossi Mizrahi – Israeli former football player and coach
 Yosef Paritzky, commonly referred to as Yossi Paritzky – Israeli politician and attorney
 Yossi Peled – Israeli politician and general
 Yossi Sarid – Israeli politician (former minister in the Israeli government)
 Yossi Shain – Israeli scholar and politician
 Yossi Shekel – Israeli football player
 Yossi Shivhon – Israeli football player
 Yossi Vardi – Israeli entrepreneur

Cinema and television 
 Yossi & Jagger, a 2002 Israeli television film
 Yossi, the 2012 film sequel to Yossi & Jagger

Literature 
 Joseph Blumenthal (character) – character in The Hope by Herman Wouk

Hebrew-language given names